Rhododendron loerzingii is a species of plant in the family Ericaceae. It is endemic to Java in Indonesia.  It is threatened by habitat loss.

References

loerzingii
Endemic flora of Java
Vulnerable plants
Taxonomy articles created by Polbot